Borimir Karamfilov (Bulgarian: Боримир Карамфилов; born 13 May 1995) is a Bulgarian footballer who plays as a midfielder for Spartak Pleven.

Career

Botev Plovdiv
Born in Devin Karamfilov started his career in Botev Plovdiv. For the 2013/14 season he was sent on loan to Rakovski. For the next season he was part of the first team of Botev. He never made a debut for the team, but scored 9 goals in the U21 League for the team in that season. He left the club in the summer of 2015 to join the Bulgarian champions Ludogorets Razgrad.

Ludogorets Razgrad
Borimir joined the 2nd team of Ludogorets - Ludogorets Razgrad II. He made his debut for the team in B Group on 25 July 2015 in a match against Dunav Ruse.

On 23 September 2015 he made his debut for Ludogorets first team in a match against Lokomotiv 1929 Mezdra for the Bulgarian Cup scoring 2 goals.

Statistics

Club

References

External links
 
 

1995 births
Living people
Bulgarian footballers
Second Professional Football League (Bulgaria) players
First Professional Football League (Bulgaria) players
Botev Plovdiv players
PFC Ludogorets Razgrad II players
PFC Ludogorets Razgrad players
FC Oborishte players
PFC Nesebar players
Neftochimic Burgas players
FC Krumovgrad players
PFC Spartak Pleven players
Association football midfielders